Bambusa farinacea is a species of Bambusa bamboo.

Distribution 
It is endemic to Ecuador.

References 

farinacea